Arnaud or Arnauld (formerly Arnoul) is the French form of the name Arnold. 
Arnoul may also have been derived from the related name Arnulf.

It may refer to the following people:
 Arnauld family, a noble French family prominent in the 17th century, associated with Jansenism
 Antoine Arnauld (1612–1694), a French Roman Catholic theologian, philosopher, and mathematician
 Henri Arnaud (pastor) (1641–1721), a pastor of the Vaudois
 François Arnaud (actor) (born 1985), a French-Canadian actor
 François Arnaud (ecclesiastic) (1721–1784), a French clergyman, writer and philologist
 Brothers Arnaud (Jacques 1781–1825), the founders of Arnaudville, Louisiana
 Jacques Leroy de Saint Arnaud (1801–1854), a French soldier and Marshal of France
 Auguste Arnaud (1825–1883), a French sculptor
 Ramón Arnaud (1877–1916), the last Mexican governor of Clipperton Island
 Henri Arnaud (athlete) (1891–1956), a French middle-distance runner
 Gabriel Arnaud (G. Arnaud, 1882–1957), a mycologist
 Yvonne Arnaud (1892–1958), a French-born pianist, singer and actress
 Leo Arnaud (1904–1991), a French-American composer, best known for scoring "Bugler's Dream", which is used as the theme for the Olympic Games
 Michel Arnaud (1915–1990), a French Army general
 Georges Arnaud, a pseudonym for French author Henri Girald (1917–1987)
 Michèle Arnaud (1919–1998), a French singer, producer and director
 Georges-Jean Arnaud (born 1928), a French author
 Marie-Hélène Arnaud (1934–1986), a French model and actress
 Davy Arnaud (born 1980), an American soccer player
 François Arnaud (actor) (born 1985), a French Canadian film and stage actor
 Loris Arnaud (born 1987), a French football player

See also
Françoise Arnoul (1931–2021), French actress